Kasyanov or Kasjanov is a Russian masculine surname, its feminine counterpart is Kasyanova or Kasjanova. It may refer to:

Alexander Kasjanov (born 1983), Russian bobsledder
Alexander Kasyanov (1891–1982), Russian composer and conductor
Artem Kasyanov (born 1983, Ukrainian football player
Hanna Kasyanova (née Melnychenko in 1983), Ukrainian heptathlete
Mikhail Kasyanov (born 1957), Russian statesman and politician
Oleksiy Kasyanov (born 1985), Ukrainian decathlete

Russian-language surnames